Chrysoclystis is a genus of moth in the family Geometridae.

Species
Chrysoclystis morbosa Prout, 1926
Chrysoclystis perornata Warren, 1896

References

External links
Natural History Museum Lepidoptera genus database

Eupitheciini